Alucita isodina is a species of moth of the family Alucitidae. It is known from Tanzania.

References

Endemic fauna of Tanzania
Alucitidae
Insects of Tanzania
Moths of Africa
Moths described in 1920
Taxa named by Edward Meyrick